Metallurg Serov is an ice hockey team in Serov, Russia. They play in the Vysshaya Liga, the second level of ice hockey in Russia. The club was founded in 1958.

Notable players

External links
Official site

Ice hockey teams in Russia
Ice hockey clubs established in 1958